Ottoman Iraq refers to the period of the history of Iraq when the region was ruled by the Ottoman Empire (1534–1920; with an interlude from 1704 to 1831 of autonomy under the  Mamluk dynasty of Iraq).Before reforms (1534–1704), Iraq was divided into four Eyalets (provinces):
 Baghdad Eyalet
 Shahrizor Eyalet
 Basra Eyalet
 Mosul Eyalet

Ottoman Iraq was later (1831–1920) divided into the three vilayets (provinces):
 Mosul Vilayet
 Baghdad Vilayet
 Basra Vilayet

During World War I, an invasion of the region was undertaken by British Empire forces and was known as the Mesopotamian campaign. Fighting commenced with the Battle of Basra in 1914 and continued for the duration of the war. The most notable action was the siege of Kut, which resulted in the surrender of the British and British Indian Army garrison of the town in April 1916, after a siege of 147 days.

Contemporary maps, showing eyalets (pre Tanzimat reforms)

Contemporary maps, showing vilayets (post Tanzimat reforms)

References

See also
 Mamluk dynasty of Iraq
 List of Ottoman governors of Baghdad
 British Mandate of Mesopotamia
 Sykes–Picot Agreement

 
Former colonies in Asia
Early Modern history of Iraq
History of the Middle East
Iraq
1534 establishments in Asia
Iraq
1704 disestablishments in Asia